Kageshwori-Manohara is a municipality in Kathmandu District in the Bagmati Province of Nepal that was established on 2 December 2014 by merging the former Village development committees of Aalapot, Bhadrabas, Danchhi, Gagalphedi, Gothatar and Mulpani. The office of the municipality is in Thali Danchhi in Ward No. 5.

Administration 
Upendra Karki of NC is Mayor and Shanta Thapa of CPN-UML is Deputy mayor of this municipality. They both were elected on 2022 Nepalese local elections.

Population
Kageshwori-Manohara municipality has a total population of 60,237 according to 2011 Nepal census.

References

Populated places in Kathmandu District